Weinmannia racemosa, commonly called kāmahi, is an evergreen small shrub to medium-sized tree of the family Cunoniaceae. It is the most abundant forest tree in New Zealand, occurring in lowland, montane, and subalpine forests and shrubland from the central North Island south to Stewart Island.

Description
Kāmahi bears racemes of small, pink or white flowers from July to January. Kāmahi generally occurs with other broadleaf trees, at times acting as a pioneer species which is eventually succeeded by the southern beeches (Nothofagus spp.) or podocarps. It reaches  or more in the Catlins of the south-eastern South Island. In forests to the west of the Southern Alps it codominates with southern rātā (Metrosideros umbellata) and black beech (N. solandri). A closely related tree, tōwai or tawhero (W. sylvicola), replaces kāmahi in the North Island north of latitude 38°S.

Uses
The bark is very high in tannin, about 13%, and was once exported for tanning. The inner bark was used as a laxative by Māori. The wood has a tendency to warp or crack, so it is little used despite the tree's abundance.

References

Trees of New Zealand
racemosa
Trees of mild maritime climate